The Hillside Group is an educational nonprofit organization founded in August 1993 to help software developers analyze and document common development and design problems as software design patterns. The Hillside Group supports the patterns community through sponsorship of the Pattern Languages of Programs conferences.

History
In August 1993, Kent Beck and Grady Booch sponsored a mountain retreat in Colorado where a group converged on foundations for software patterns. Ward Cunningham, Ralph Johnson, Ken Auer, Hal Hildebrand, Grady Booch, Kent Beck, and Jim Coplien examined architect Christopher Alexander's work in pattern language and their own experiences as software developers to combine the concepts of objects and patterns and apply them to writing computer programs. The group agreed to build on Erich Gamma's study of object-oriented patterns, but to use patterns in a generative way in the sense that Alexander uses patterns for urban planning and architecture. They used the word generative to mean creational, to distinguish them from Gamma's patterns' that captured observations. The group was meeting on the side of a hill, which led them to name themselves the Hillside Group.

Since then, the Hillside Group has been incorporated as an educational non-profit organization. It sponsors and helps run Pattern Languages of Programs (PLoP) conferences such as PLoP, EuroPlop, ChiliPlop, GuruPLoP, Asian PLoP, Scrum PLoP, Viking PLoP and Sugarloaf PLoP. The Hillside Group has also worked on the Pattern Languages of Program Design series of books.

Activities
The Hillside Group sponsors the Pattern Languages of Programs conferences in various countries, including the U.S., Brazil, Norway, Germany, Australia, and Japan. The Hillside Group assisted in publishing the Pattern Languages of Program Design book series until 2006. Since 2006, The Hillside Group has published patterns and conference proceedings through the Association for Computing Machinery (ACM) Digital Library.

Patterns Library
The Hillside Patterns Library contains a comprehensive archive of patterns developed by the community, either directly or indirectly through the PLoP conferences.

Conferences
The Hillside Group sponsors the conferences listed.  The conferences focus on writing patterns, workshops, and invited talks related to pattern development. Most of the conferences are held annually and encourage attendees to submit papers pre-conference for inclusion in the writer's workshops. The papers undergo a shepherding process, where they are analyzed and evolved before conference attendance.

 PLoP: Pattern Languages of Programs
 ChiliPLoP: Southwestern Conference on Pattern Languages of Programs 
 EuroPLoP: European Conference on Pattern Languages of Programs 
 AsianPLoP: Japanese Conference on Pattern Languages of Programs 
 SugarLoafPLoP: Latin American Conference on Pattern Languages of Programming 
 VikingPLoP: Nordic Conference on Pattern Languages of Programs 
 ScrumPLoP: Conference on Pattern Languages of Scrum 
 EduPLoP: Educational Patterns Writing Workshop

The Hillside Group Board
The President of The Hillside Group for 2010–2014 is Joseph Yoder of The Refactory, Inc.

The Hillside Group is led by a Board consisting of the President, Vice-President, Chief Operating Officer, Treasurer, two Directors, Secretary, two Editors in Chief and four Members.

Current board

Founding members

 Ward Cunningham
 Ralph Johnson
 Ken Auer
 Hal Hildebrand
 Grady Booch
 Kent Beck
 Jim Coplien

References

External links
 The Hillside Group official website
 The Hillside Group European website
 List of PLoP Conferences
 LNCS Transactions on Pattern Languages of Programming
 ACM Digital Library

Professional associations based in the United States
Computer science organizations
Information technology organizations
Organizations established in 1993
Software design patterns